Tajar-e Alavi (also Romanized as Ţajar-e ‘Alavī; also known as Tajar and Ţajjar) is a village in Tork-e Sharqi Rural District, Jowkar District, Malayer County, Hamadan Province, Iran. According to the 2006 census, its population was 663, in 164 families.

References 

Populated places in Malayer County